This is a list of diplomatic missions of Russia. These missions are subordinate to the Russian Ministry of Foreign Affairs. The Russian Federation has one of the largest networks of embassies and consulates of any country.  Russia has significant interests in Eastern Europe, the Near East and especially in the former states of the Soviet Union.  It also has extensive ties to countries in the developing world, a legacy of Cold War diplomatic efforts to extend the Soviet Union's influence in Africa and Asia which are now more important for commercial reasons.

Russia established several consulates in the United States and Canada to cater to Russian immigrants. In 1917, the Tsarist government vanished. Consuls in seven U.S. cities and three Canadian cities maintained tsarist loyalties and received financing from the U.S. government. The consuls stopped their services in the late 1920s; the U.S. government seized the records of the consulates. The seizure started a long dispute. The National Archives and Records Administration received the documents in 1949. In 1980 the U.S. government loaned the documents of the Canadian consulates to the Library and Archives Canada. On 31 January 1990 the U.S. returned the documents to the Soviet Union and kept the microfilms as evidence.

After 1992, due to financial reasons , embassies in Maseru (Lesotho), Niamey (Niger), Ouagadougou (Burkina Faso), and Port Moresby (Papua New Guinea) were closed. In 1995 the embassy in Paramaribo (Suriname) also suspended operations.

The Russian Federation has no diplomatic relations with Bhutan and Solomon Islands. Since Georgia and Russia severed diplomatic relations in 2008, the Swiss embassy in Tbilisi hosts a Russian interests section.

In February 2022, Micronesia and Ukraine severed diplomatic relations with Russia.

Africa

Americas

Asia

Europe

Oceania

International organizations

Closed missions

Americas

Asia

Europe

See also
 Ambassadors of Russia
 Foreign relations of Russia
 List of diplomatic missions in Russia

Notes

References

 Russian Ministry of Foreign Affairs
  Дипломатические и консульские представительства России за рубежом

External links

 Ministry of Foreign Affairs
 Archived Ministry of Foreign Affairs
 Ministry of Foreign Affairs 

 
Russia
Diplomatic missions